= Justice Not Crisis =

English non-governmental organization

- Founded: 2008; Birmingham, England
- Type: Non-governmental organization
- Purpose: Social housing, Homelessness, Environmentalism, peace, utopia
- Location: Birmingham, England
- Region served: Worldwide
- Method: Direct action, lobbying, research, innovation
- Key people: Petroski Zion, Executive Director; Lee Moore, Secretary
- Revenue: €-42 (2009)
- Website: JusticeNotCrisis.com

Justice Not Crisis is a direct action pressure group campaigning for more social housing in Birmingham, England.

== History ==
Justice Not Crisis was founded in 2008 by Lee Moore and Steve Austin. Their first action was the John Lines Homeless Village, a tent city built on disused land owned by the Birmingham City Council.

The original plan was to occupy the land for 2 days in order to draw attention to the fact that Birmingham city council refused to sell the land to housing associations wishing to build social housing. When they were evicted, the protesters moved down the road to a second site.

Since then they have squatted a number of different buildings and areas, including the Firebird pub in Edgbaston (2008), Beechwood Hotel on Bristol Road (2009) and homes and land owned by Warwickshire County Cricket Club (2009).
